Norway was represented at the 1992 Summer Olympics in Barcelona by the Norwegian Olympic Committee and Confederation of Sports. 83 competitors, 51 men and 32 women, took part in 64 events in 17 sports.

Medalists

Competitors
The following is the list of number of competitors in the Games.

Archery

In the fourth appearance by the nation in the archery competition at the Olympics, Norway was again represented by only one man.  He came within three points of defeating the eventual gold medallist in the semifinal, but was defeated there and again in the bronze medal match to come home with a certificate of merit rather than a medal.

Men's Individual Competition:
 Martinus Grov — Bronze Medal Match, 4th place (3-2)

Athletics

Men's 800 metres
 Atle Douglas
 Heat – 1:48.08
 Semi final – 1:48.63 (→ did not advance)

 Vebjørn Rodal
 Heat – 1:48.00
 Semi final – 1:49.53 (→ did not advance)

Men's 10,000 metres
 John Halvorsen
 Heat – 28:21.57
 Final – 29:53.91 (→ 19th place)

Men's High Jump 
 Steinar Hoen 
 Qualifying Heat — 2.23m (→ did not advance)

 Håkon Särnblom
 Qualifying Heat — 2.20m (→ did not advance)

Men's Discus Throw 
 Olav Jenssen
 Qualifying Heat — 60.00m (→ did not advance)

Women's Discus Throw
 Mette Bergmann
 Qualifying Heat — 58.32m (→ did not advance)

Women's Javelin Throw 
 Trine Hattestad
 Round 1 — 67.20 metres
 Final — 63.54 metres (→ 5th place)

Women's Heptathlon
Anne Brit Skjæveland

Badminton

Boxing

Canoeing

Cycling

Nine cyclists, six men and three women, represented Norway in 1992.

Men's road race
 Bjørn Stenersen
 Lars Kristian Johnsen
 Karsten Stenersen

Men's team time trial
 Stig Kristiansen
 Roar Skaane
 Bjørn Stenersen
 Karsten Stenersen

Men's individual pursuit
 Steffen Kjærgaard

Women's road race
 Monica Valvik — 2:05:03 (→ 5th place)
 Gunhild Ørn — 2:05:46 (→ 37th place)
 Ingunn Bollerud

Diving

Men's 3m Springboard
Christian Styren
 Preliminary Round — 347.94 points (→ did not advance, 19th place)

Equestrianism

Gymnastics

Handball

Women's Team Competition
Preliminary round (group B)
 Norway – South Korea 16-27
 Norway – Spain 20-16
 Norway – Austria 19-17
Semifinals
 Norway – Unified Team 23-20
Gold Medal Match
 Norway – South Korea 21-28 (→  Silver  Medal)

Team roster
Cathrine Svendsen
Heidi Tjugum
Annette Skotvoll
Ingrid Steen
Heidi Sundal
Hanne Hogness
Karin Pettersen
Tonje Sagstuen
Hege Frøseth
Susann Goksør
Henriette Henriksen
Mona Dahle
Kristine Duvholt
Siri Eftedal
Head coach: Sven-Tore Jacobsen

Judo

 Men's Half-Lightweight 
Stig Traavik

Rowing

Sailing

Men's Sailboard (Lechner A-390)
Per Haugen
 Final Ranking — 233.0 points (→ 22nd place)

Men's 470 Class
Herman Johannessen and Pal McCarthy
 Final Ranking — 71.7 points (→ 5th place)

Women's Sailboard (Lechner A-390)
Jorunn Horgen
 Final Ranking — 102.7 points (→ 8th place)

Women's 470 Class
Ida Andersen and Tonje Kristiansen
 Final Ranking — 100 points (→ 14th place)

Shooting

Swimming

Men's 100m Freestyle
 Jarl Inge Melberg
 Heat – 51.39 (→ did not advance, 28th place)

Men's 200m Freestyle
 Jarl Inge Melberg
 Heat – 1:50.70 (→ did not advance, 19th place)

Men's 400m Freestyle
 Jarl Inge Melberg
 Heat – 4:03.49 (→ did not advance, 38th place)

Men's 100m Backstroke
 Thomas Holmen Sopp
 Heat – 58.45 (→ did not advance, 39th place)

Men's 200m Backstroke
 Thomas Holmen Sopp
 Heat – 2:05.91 (→ did not advance, 31st place)

Men's 100m Breaststroke
 Børge Mørk
 Heat – 1:05.47 (→ did not advance, 37th place)

Men's 200m Breaststroke
 Børge Mørk
 Heat – 2:19.11 (→ did not advance, 26th place)

Men's 4 × 200 m Freestyle Relay
 Jarl Inge Melberg, Thomas Holmen Sopp, Trond Høines, and Kjell Ivar Lundemoen
 Heat – 7:31.35 (→ did not advance, 14th place)

Men's 4 × 100 m Medley Relay
 Thomas Holmen Sopp, Børge Mørk, Trond Høines, and Jarl Inge Melberg
 Heat – 3:52.42 (→ did not advance, 17th place)

Women's 200m Freestyle
 Irene Dalby
 Heat – 2:04.28 (→ did not advance, 23rd place)

Women's 400m Freestyle
 Irene Dalby
 Heat – 4:16.05
 B-Final – 4:14.46 (→ 11th place)

Women's 800m Freestyle
 Irene Dalby
 Heat – 8:38.58
 Final – 8:37.12 (→ 5th place)

Tennis

Men's Singles Competition
 Christian Ruud
 First round — Lost to Boris Becker (Germany) 6-3, 6-7, 7-5, 6-7, 3-6

Men's Doubles Competition
 Bent-Ove Pedersen and Christian Ruud
 First round — Lost to Wayne Ferreira and Piet Norval (South Africa) 2-6, 4-6, 7-5, 3-6

Wrestling

Men's Greco-Roman Light-Flyweight 
Lars Rønningen

Men's Greco-Roman Flyweight 
Jon Rønningen

References

Nations at the 1992 Summer Olympics
1992
Summer Olympics